The Class 168 Clubman is a British diesel multiple unit (DMU) passenger train used on Chiltern Line services between London Marylebone and the West Midlands. The trains were built by Adtranz at the Derby Litchurch Lane Works in several batches from 1998.

The first batch was classified 168/0 under TOPS and resembled the Class 165 units previously built by BREL York. The Networker-design cab was an interim solution pending the design of a completely new cab for further Turbostar batches. Subsequent builds, subclassed as 168/1 and 168/2, were constructed at the same time as the Class 170 Turbostar and thus are part of the Turbostar family of trains.

The first batch of Clubman 168/0 carriages ordered by Chiltern Railways were the first units ordered by any train operating company since the privatisation of the UK industry in 1996. They were delivered as 3-car sets but later lengthened to 4-car sets.

One unit has been converted to hybrid operation as of 2022.

Description

Seating 
A typical Class 168 consists of 2+2 standard-class seating throughout, arranged either around tables or in airline-style seating with pull-down tables. The majority of seats are facing seats. The Class 168 is carpeted throughout with luggage racks, air conditioning, and two or more toilets per set (one for disabled users, with baby changing facilities). Passenger information systems are fitted in every car and on the outside of class 168/2 cars.

Variants
Three different variants of the 168 were produced - 168/0, 168/1 and 168/2. Both Classes 168/1 and 168/2 are actually of the same design as the Class 170 Turbostar DMU trains, mainly due to the redesigned cab ends. The nine Class 170s that Chiltern obtained from First TransPennine Express were converted by Brush Traction to operate with the Class 168 fleet, and redesignated as Class 168/3.  168329 has been converted by Porterbrook into a diesel/battery hybrid. It was tested in 2021 on the Ecclesbourne Valley Railway and entered service as "HybridFlex" in February 2022.

Operations

Network SouthEast (NSE) originally planned the Class 168 for its expansion of service on the Chiltern Main Line to Birmingham Snow Hill or New Street.

In the event, privatisation intervened before NSE acquired any units; Chiltern Railways operates these units, in similar diagrams to those originally planned by NSE.

Named units
The following units have been assigned names:
168001 Adrian Shooter

References

Further reading

168
Adtranz multiple units
Train-related introductions in 1998